Trachyaretaon gatla is a species of Phasmatodea native to the Philippine island Palawan.

Distribution area 
The species is so far only known from a single female who was found on May 28, 1991 at waterfalls in Port Barton 120 km northeast of Puerto Princesa, the capital of the province of Palawan. This makes Trachyaretaon gatla the only species of the genus from the island of Palawan so far. All other representatives come either from Luzon or from the upstream Babuyan Islands to the north.

Characteristics 
In contrast to the other described species of the genus, Trachyaretaon gatla with  body length is somewhat smaller than the other species, where the size of Trachyaretaon echinatus  is given by Joseph Redtenbacher with only . In contrast to this, in  Trachyaretaon gatla  the supraanal plate (epiproct), ie the eleventh tergite as well as the seventh sternite of the abdomen are clearly notched. The coloring is dominated by different shades of red and brown. The arrangement and shape of the spines can be described as follows (see also Acanthotaxy of Heteropterygidae). On the head the supra-antennals protrude, the medial coronals are arranged in a circle with two small spines inside. Of the supra orbitals, only the anterior ones are formed as large spines. The four coronals are the same size. thorax and abdomen with median, sometimes interrupted edge. The anterolateral spines on the pronotum are present. The pronotum shows a transverse depression. On the mesonotum there are short but broad premedial spines and four median mesonotals arranged in a group. The posterior mesonotals are compound and stand out clearly. The lateral spines are short. The metanotum shows both anterior and very distinct and composite posterior metanotals. On the pleura of the metanotum, compound supracoxals located above the coxae. The median segment (first abdominal segment) has anterior, medial, and posterior spines, with the rear pair being larger than the pairs in front. The second to ninth abdominal segments are about the same length. On the second to fourth segments there is a submedial and sublateral spine. On the seventh to ninth segments there is a distinctive crest, which is located on the seventh segment in the rear half. It is narrower on the eighth segment than on the seventh, but high in the middle. On the ninth segment, the ridge protrudes beyond the rear edge of the segment. The seventh abdominal segment has a postero medial notch. The supraanal plate is elongated and rectangular, does not extend to the tip of the subgenital plate and also has a notch at the back. The elongated subgenital plate has a sharp longitudinal keel ventrally.

Taxonomy 
Oliver Zompro described the species in 2004 using an adult female. It was declared as holotype of the species and is in the author's collection, which, according to him, is affiliated with the Zoological Museum of the University of Kiel, but is not available there. The species name "gatla" is derived from the Filipino Tagalog language and means there roughly "notched". It refers to the notch on the supraanal plate.

References 

Phasmatodea
Phasmatodea of Asia
Insects described in 2004